Elaeocarpus amoenus is a species of flowering plant in the Elaeocarpaceae family used as a medicinal plant. It is endemic to Sri Lanka, where it is called thiththa weralu – තිත්ත වෙරළු in Singhalese.

See also
 List of Elaeocarpus species

References

External links
 jstor.org

amoenus
Endemic flora of Sri Lanka